X-Men: Mutant Wars is a side-scrolling beat 'em up game for Game Boy Color released in 2000. It is the second X-Men titled released for the system. It was released to coincide with the release of the X-Men film on DVD.

Plot
A band of cyborgs is terrorizing the planet. Believing that Magneto is controlling the cyborgs, the X-Men try to defeat him. The player can take control of Wolverine, Storm, Cyclops, Iceman, and Gambit as they prepare for the battle to save the planet.

Gameplay
Characters can be changed at any time during the game, which is important as their power level decreases through the game. When the player changes character, those are not being controlled will gradually recover their power level. Also, some areas can only be completed by using the unique abilities of certain characters.

An alternate game mode has the player facing all the boss characters from the main game, and if the current character runs out of power, they cannot be used again.

Bosses

Sabretooth - Wolverine's most hated enemy. You'll fight him twice. First on stage 1, then along-side Mystique on stage 6.

Waraxe - A gruesome ax battler. Boss of the second stage.

Specter - A big blue thug. Boss of third stage.

Shadow - A tricky robot runt. Boss of fourth stage.

Sentinel - A robot giant and well known enemy of the X-Men. Boss of fifth stage.

Mystique - A shapeshifting mutant and mother of the X-Men members, Rouge and Nightcrawler. Boss of stage 6.

Magneto - Master of magnetism, and a friend and enemy of Professor X. Boss of stage 7.

System A - An evil computer. Boss of Stage 8.

Apocalypse II - A robotic clone of Apocalypse. Final boss of the game.

Reception

The game so far has a score of 49.50% on GameRankings. Some critics say it was better than X-Men: Mutant Academy on the Game Boy Color. However, many criticized the game for its frustrating controls and long boss battles. Despite the criticism, some praised the soundtrack.

Unreleased PlayStation port
There was going to be a PlayStation version, but like X-Men: Mutant Academy for Nintendo 64, it was never released, and there are screenshots of it that can be found.

References

External links 
 
 X-Men: Mutant Wars at GameFAQs

2000 video games
Game Boy Color-only games
Game Boy Color games
Superhero video games
Video games based on X-Men
Video games developed in Japan
Video games set in Canada
Video games set in New York City
Video games set in Washington, D.C.